Bring 'Em In is the 13th studio album by blues musician Buddy Guy, released in 2005 on Silvertone Records. The album is made up almost entirely of songs covered by Buddy Guy, containing only one original composition by the artist.

The album features a number of collaborations with other artists including: Carlos Santana (guitar), Tracy Chapman (vocals), John Mayer (guitar), Keb' Mo' (guitar), Anthony Hamilton (vocals), Robert Randolph (pedal steel), and Keith Richards (guitar).

Track listing

Charts

Personnel

Musicians
 Buddy Guy - lead vocals, lead guitar
 Willie Weeks - bass
 Myron Dove - bass
 Steve Jordan - drums, backing vocals
 Luis Conte - percussion
 Bernie Worrell - keyboards
 Ivan Neville - keyboards, backing vocals
 Chester Thompson - keyboards
 Danny Kortchmar - guitar
 Jack Hale - trombone
 Ben Cauley - trumpet
 Andrew Love - tenor saxophone
 Lannie McMilan - tenor saxophone
 Jim Horn - baritone saxophone, flute

Guest musicians
 Carlos Santana
 Tracey Chapman
 Keb' Mo'  - track 7
 John Mayer
 Anthony Hamilton
 Robert Randolph
 Keith Richards - guitar on "The Price You Gotta Pay"

Production
 Steve Jordan - Producer
 Don Smith - Recording
 Willie Mitchell and Lester Snell - Horn Arrangements
 Jim Horn - Horn Arrangement on Track 9
 Derrick Santini - Photographer

References

2005 albums
Buddy Guy albums
Jive Records albums